Flodaigh is a tidal island lying to the north of Benbecula and south of Grimsay in the Outer Hebrides, Scotland. It is connected to Benbecula by a causeway.

The island is 145 hectares and in 2001 had a population of 11 and 7 in 2011. The census refers to the island by its anglicised name of "Flodda".

Notes and references

Uist islands